Bob is a male given name or a hypocorism, usually of Robert, and sometimes a diminutive of Bobby. It is most common in English-speaking countries such as the United States, Canada, Ireland, the United Kingdom, Australia, and New Zealand and some African countries.

It most likely originated from the hypocorism Rob, short for Robert. Rhyming names were popular in the Middle Ages, so Richard became Rick, Hick, or Dick, William became Will, Gill, or Bill, and Robert became Rob, Hob, Dob, Nob, or Bob.

It can also be used as a nickname for the name Vladimir, since a commonly used nickname for Vladimir is Vova which in Cyrillic script (Вова) resembles the name Bob in Latin script; historically, both names (Robert and Vladimir) share the same meaning.

In 1960 nearly 3,000 babies in the United States were given the name Bob, compared to fewer than 50 in 2000.

Politicians and businessmen

A-B
 Bob Anderson (politician) (born 1939), former member of the Legislative Assembly of Manitoba
 Bob Anthony (born 1948), member of the Oklahoma Corporation Commission
 Bob Arum (born 1931), American businessman and lawyer
 Bob Asher (born 1937), figure in Republican Pennsylvania politics
 Bob Ashley (born 1953), West Virginia State Senator
 Bob Avakian (born 1943), American communist politician
 Bob Ballinger (born 1974), member of the Arkansas House of Representatives
 Bob Barr (born 1948), former U.S. Representative from Georgia
 Bob Bartlett (1904–1968), U.S. Senator from Alaska
 Bob Bennett (politician) (1933–2016), U.S. Senator from Utah
 Bob Beaumont (1932–2011), American automobile businessman
 Bob Beauprez (born 1948), former U.S. Representative from Colorado
 Bob Beach (born 1959), West Virginia State Senator
 Bob Beers (born 1959), politician in Nevada
 Bob Benzen (born 1959), Canadian MP
 Bob Bergland (1928–2018), former United States Secretary of Agriculture and U.S. Representative from Minnesota
 Bob Bergren, member of the Montana House of Representatives
 Bob Bird (politician) (born 1951), politician in Alaska
 Bob Blackman (born 1956), British MP from Harrow East
 Bob Bland (born 1982), American activist
 Bob Bose (born 1932), former mayor of Surrey, British Columbia
 Bob Bowman, former treasurer of Michigan
 Bob Brady (born 1945), current U.S. Representative from Pennsylvania
 Bob Brown (born 1944), Australian Senator from Tasmania
 Bob Brown (Australian Labor politician) (born 1933), Australian MP from Hunter, New South Wales
 Bob Brown (Montana politician) (born 1947), former Montana Secretary of State
 Bob Bullock (1929–1999), Lieutenant Governor of Texas
 Bob Burns (born 1938), Arizona Corporation Commissioner

C 
 Bob Carr (born 1947), former Australian Minister for Foreign Affairs
 Bob Carr (born 1943), former member of the U.S. House of Representatives
 Bob Carr (Florida politician) (1899–1967), mayor of Orlando, Florida
 Bob Carruthers (politician), former member of the Nova Scotia House of Assembly
 Bob Casey Sr., (1932–2000), former Governor of Pennsylvania
 Bob R. Casey (1915–1986), member of the U.S. House of Representatives
 Bob Casey Jr. (born 1960), current US Senator from Pennsylvania
 Bob Cashell (born 1938), former Lieutenant Governor of Nevada and Mayor of Reno
 Bob Clement (born 1943), former member of the US House of Representatives
 Bob Coffin (born 1942), former Nevada State Senator
 Bob Collins (1946–2007), Australian Senator from the Northern Territory
 Bob Conley (born 1965), candidate for United States Senate in 2008
 Bob Corbin (1922–2013), member of the Ohio House of Representatives
 Bob K. Corbin (born 1928), former Arizona Attorney General
 Bob Corker (born 1952), U.S. Senator from Tennessee
 Bob Cortes (born 1963), member of the Florida House of Representatives
 Bob Cotton (1915–2006), Senator for New South Wales
 Bob Crowell (1945–2020), Mayor of Carson City, Nevada

D-F
 Bob Dadae (born 1961), Papua New Guinea politician
 Bob Davies (businessman) (born 1948), British businessman
 Bob Day (born 1952), Senator for South Australia
 Bob Dearing (born 1935), Mississippi State Senator
 Bob Debus (born 1943), former MP from and Attorney General of New South Wales
 Bob dela Cruz (born 1977), Filipino politician and contestant on Big Brother
 Bob Diamond (banker) (born 1951), British-born American banker
 Bob Dixon (born 1969), Missouri State Senator
 Bob Dold (born 1969), former U.S. Representative from Illinois
 Bob Dole (1923–2021), American former senator and Presidential candidate
 Bob Dornan (born 1933), former U.S. Representative from California
 Bob Drewel (born 1946), former Snohomish County Executive
 Bob Duff (born 1971), Connecticut State Senator
 Bob Duffy (born 1954), former Lieutenant Governor of New York
 Bob Duynstee (1920–2014), member of the Dutch House of Representatives
 Bob Edgar (1943–2013), U.S. Representative from Pennsylvania
 Bob Ehrlich (born 1957), former Governor of Maryland
 Bob Etheridge (born 1941), former U.S. Representative from North Carolina
 Bob Ewing (born 1954), South Dakota State Senator
 Bob Ferguson (politician) (born 1965), Attorney General of Washington
 Bob Filner (born 1942), former Mayor of San Diego
 Bob Fioretti (born 1953), former Chicago City Alderman
 Bob Fitrakis (born 1955), Ohio politician
 Bob Flanders (born 1949), former Rhode Island Supreme Court justice
 Bob Foster (politician) (born 1947), former Mayor of Long Beach, California
 Bob Franks (1951–2010), U.S. Representative from New Jersey

G-H
 Bob Gable (born 1934), politician in Kentucky
 Bob Gammage (1934–2012), U.S. Representative from Texas
 Bob Gibbs (born 1954), U.S. Representative from Ohio
 Bob Gibbs (Australian politician) (born 1946), former member of the Queensland Legislative Assembly
 Bob Giuda (born 1952), former member of the New Hampshire House of Representatives
 Bob Godec (born 1956), U.S. Ambassador to Kenya
 Bob Goodlatte (born 1952), US Representative from Virginia
 Bob Graham (born 1936), former US Senator from Florida
 Bob F. Griffin (1935–2021), Speaker of the Missouri House of Representatives
 Bob Gunther (born 1943), member of the Minnesota House of Representatives
 Bob Guzzardi (born 1944), lawyer and political activist in Pennsylvania
 Bob Hagan (born 1949), former Ohio State Representative
 Bob Haldeman (1926–1993), White House Chief of Staff
 Bob Hanner (1945–2019), American politician and businessman
 Bob Harvey (mayor) (born 1940), former Mayor of Waitakere City, New Zealand
 Bob Hasegawa (born 1952), member of the Washington Senate
 Bob Hawke (1929–2019), former Prime Minister of Australia
 Bob Healey (1957–2016), perennial candidate in Rhode Island
 Bob Heffron (1890–1978), Premier of New South Wales
 Bob Herron (born 1951), member of the Alaska House of Representatives
 Bob Hitchens (1952–2020), American football player and coach
 Bob Hogue (born 1953), basketball coach and former Hawaii State Senator
 Bob Holden (born 1949), former Governor of Missouri
 Bob Huff (born 1953), former California State Senator
 Bob Hugin (born 1954), American businessman
 Bob Huntley (born 1932), former Idaho state representative and Supreme Court justice

I-K
 Bob Iger (born 1951), chairman and CEO of the Walt Disney Company
 Bob Inglis (born 1959), former U.S. Representative from South Carolina
 Bob Jenson (1931–2018), member of the Oregon House of Representatives
 Bob Johnson (Arkansas state representative) (born 1953), member of the Arkansas House of Representatives
 Bob Johnson (politician) (born 1962), member of the Arkansas General Assembly
 Bob Jones (businessman) (born 1939), New Zealand businessman and politician
 Bob Jones (police commissioner) (1955–2014), British police commissioner
 Bob Jones (Texas businessman), American businessman and convicted criminal
 Bobby Jones, American amateur golfer
 Robert B. Jordan, III (born 1932), former Lieutenant Governor of North Carolina
 Robert Jubinville, member of the Massachusetts Governor's Council
 Bob Kasten (born 1942), former U.S. Senator from Wisconsin
 Bob Katter (born 1945), Australian politician
 Bob Katter Sr. (1918–1990), Australian politician
 Bob Kelleher (1923–2011), American politician in Montana
 Bob Kerrey (born 1943), American former governor and senator
 Bob Kilger (born 1944), former Canadian MP from Ontario
 Bob Kiley (1935–2016), American-born London transit commissioner
 Bob Kirkwood (1939–2017), American environmentalist and businessman who is a member of the Sierra Nevada Conservancy
 Bob Kiss (born 1947), former Mayor of Burlington, Vermont
 Bob Kraft (born 1941), American businessman
 Bob Krause (born 1950), former member of the Iowa House of Representatives
 Bob Krist (born 1957), member of the Nebraska Legislature
 Bob Krueger (born 1935), former U.S. Senator from Texas

L-M
 Bob Lanier (politician) (1925–2014), Mayor of Houston
 Bob B. Lessard (born 1931), former Minnesota state senator
 Bob Livingston (born 1943), former U.S. Representative from Louisiana
 Bob Latta (born 1956), U.S. Representative from Ohio
 Bob Lutz (businessman) (born 1932), Swiss American automobile executive
 Bob Lynn (born 1933), member of the Alaska House of Representatives
 Bob Maclennan, Baron Maclennan of Rogart (1936–2020), former British MP for Caithness, Sutherland, and Easter Ross
 Bob Margett (born 1929), former California state senator
 Bob Marshall (born 1944), member of the Virginia House of Delegates
 Bob Martinez (born 1934), former Governor of Florida
 Bob Massie (born 1956), Massachusetts politician
 Bob Mathias (1930–2006), U.S. Representative from California
 Bob Matsui (1941–2005), U.S. Representative from California
 Bob McDermott (born 1963), member of the Hawaii House of Representatives
 Bob McDonnell (born 1954), American former governor
 Bob McEwen (born 1950), former member of the U.S. House of Representatives from Ohio
 Bob McLeod (politician) (born 1952), Premier of the Northwest Territories
 Bob McNair (1937–2018), American businessman
 Bob Mercer (born 1946), American businessman
 Bob Menendez (born 1954), U.S. Senator from New Jersey
 Bob Michel (1923–2017), former U.S. Representative from Illinois and House Minority Leader
 Bob Miller (Nevada governor) (born 1945), former Governor of Nevada
 Bob Mollohan (1909–1999), United States Representative from West Virginia
 Bob Moretti (1936–1984), Speaker of the California House of Assembly
 Bob Muglia (born 1959), American businessman

N-P
 Bob Ney (born 1954), former member of the US House of Representatives from Ohio
 Bob Nicholas (born 1957), member of the Wyoming House of Representatives
 Bob Nimmo (1922–2005), Administrator of U.S. Veterans Affairs
 Bob Nonini (born 1954), member of the Idaho State Senate
 Bob Oaks (born 1952), member of the New York State Assembly
 Bob Oatley (1928–2016), Australian businessman
 Bob O'Connor (mayor) (1944–2006), Mayor of Pittsburgh
 Bob O'Dekirk, current mayor of Joliet, Illinois
 Bob Odell (politician) (born 1943), former member of the New Hampshire Senate
 Bob Odom (1935–2014), longtime Louisiana Commissioner of Agriculture and Forestry
 Bob O'Donnell (born 1943), former member of the Pennsylvania House of Representatives
 Bob O'Halloran (1888–1974), member of the New South Wales Legislative Assembly
 Bob O'Lone (1836–1871), American-born Canadian politician and soldier in Manitoba
 Bob Onder (born 1962), member of the Missouri Senate and House of Representatives
 Bob Packwood (born 1932), former United States Senator from Oregon
 Bob Pacheco (born 1934), former California State Assemblyman
 Bob Pamplin (born 1941), American businessman and media mogul
 Bob Parker (mayor) (born 1953), former Mayor of Christchurch, New Zealand
 Bob Peeler (born 1952), former Lieutenant Governor of South Carolina
 Bob Perciasepe (born 1951), former acting Administrator of the U.S. Environmental Protection Agency
 Bob J. Perry (1932–2013), political activist in Texas
 Bob Peterson (North Dakota politician) (born 1951), former North Dakota State Auditor
 Bob Peterson (Ohio politician) (born 1962), member of the Ohio State Senate
 Bob Price (1927–2004), U.S. Representative from Texas

R-S
 Bob Rae (born 1948), Canadian former premier and lawyer
 Bob Riley (born 1944), former Governor of Alabama
 Bob C. Riley (1924–1994), Governor of Arkansas
 Bob Roberts (Australian politician) (born 1952), former Member of the New South Wales Legislative Assembly
 Bob Robertson (1885–1961), American lawyer and politician
 Bob Robson (politician), former member of the Arizona House of Representatives
 Bob Ronka (born 1943), former Los Angeles City Council member
 Bob Ryan (mayor), former mayor of Sheboygan, Wisconsin
 Bob Schaffer (born 1962), former U.S. Representative from Colorado
Bob Scott (businessman) (born1944), British businessman involved in the arts and the Manchester community
Bob Scott (New South Wales politician) (born 1943), member of the New South Wales Legislative Council
 Bob Scott (Queensland politician) (1931–2011), member of the Queensland Legislative Assembly
 Bob Seely (born 1966), British MP for the Isle of Wight
 Bob Sercombe (born 1949), former Australian MP from Maribyrnong
 Bob Shamansky (1927–2011), U.S. Representative from Ohio
 Bob Shiller (born 1946), American economist
 Bob Skelly (born 1943), former Leader of the Opposition of British Columbia
 Bob Smith (American politician) (born 1941), former U.S. Senator from New Hampshire
 Bob Smith (Australian politician) (born 1948), former member of the Victorian Legislative Council
 Bob Smith (New Jersey State Senator) (born 1947), current New Jersey State Senator
 Robert Freeman Smith (born 1931), former U.S. Representative from Oregon
 Bob Stiller, American billionaire businessman
 Bob Straub (1920–2002), Governor of Oregon
 Bob Stump (1927–2003), U.S. Congressman from Arizona
 Bob Stump (born 1971), former Arizona Corporation Commissioner
 Bob Such (1944–2014), South Australia politician

T-Z
 Bob Taft (born 1942), former Governor of Ohio
 Bob Thomas, member of the Virginia House of Delegates
 Bob Tiernan, former member of the Oregon House of Representatives
 Bob Tisch (1926–2005), American businessman
 Bob Tuke (born 1947), 2008 Tennessee Democratic U.S. Senate nominee
 Bob Turner (New York politician) (born 1941), former U.S. Representative from New York
 Bob van den Bos (born 1947), Dutch politician
 Bob Vander Plaats (born 1963), American activist and politician
 Bob Vogel (politician) (born 1951), member of the Minnesota House of Representatives
 Bob Walkup (1936–2021), mayor of Tucson, Arizona
 Bob Wanner (born 1949), Speaker of the Alberta Legislative Assembly
 Bob Wieckowski (born 1955), California State Senator
 Bob Wilson (1916–1999), U.S. Representative from California
 Bob Wise (born 1948), former Governor of West Virginia
 Bob Wooley (born 1947), member of the New Mexico House of Representatives
 Bob Work (born 1953), Deputy U.S. Secretary of Defense
 Bob Worsley (born 1956), Arizona State Senator
 Bob Wright (1935–2012), Utah politician
 Bob Young (businessman), Canadian entrepreneur
 Bob Young (mayor) (born 1948), former Mayor of Augusta, Georgia
 Bob Ziegelbauer (born 1951), former member of the Wisconsin State Assembly
 Bob Ziegler (1921–1991), member of the Alaska State Senate
 Bob Zimmer (born 1968), Canadian MP for Prince George-Peace River, British Columbia
 Bob Zuckerman (born 1960), American businessman and politician

Musicians

A-M
 Bob Andy (born 1944), Jamaican reggae singer
 Bob Beckham (1927–2013), American country music singer
 Bob Belden (1956–2015), American saxophonist and composer
 Bob Benny (1926–2011), Belgian singer and musical theatre performer
 Bob Bert, American rock drummer
 Bob Bogle (1934–2009), American guitarist
 Bob Brozman (1954–2013), American guitarist
 Bob Casale (1952–2014), American musician with the band Devo
 Bob Crewe (1930–2014), American songwriter, singer, record producer
 Bob Crosby (1913–1993), American swing singer
 Bob DiPiero (born 1950/1951), American country musician
 Bob Dylan (born 1941), American singer and songwriter
 Bob Gibson (musician) (1931–1996), American folk singer
 Bob Geldof (born 1951), Irish singer
 Bob Gulla, American music writer
 Bob Helm (1914–2003), American jazz clarinetist
 Bob Hilliard (1918–1971), American songwriter
 Bob Jackson (musician) (born 1949), British rock guitarist
 Bob Johnson (musician) (born 1944), British guitarist
 Bob Kakaha (born 1970), American bass guitarist
 Bob Kilpatrick, American gospel musician
 Bob Kirkpatrick (musician) (born 1934), American blues musician from Texas
 Bob Marley (1945–1981), Jamaican reggae singer
 Bob Moore (born 1932), American bassist
 Bob Mothersbaugh (born 1952), American guitarist
 Bob Mould (born 1960), American singer and guitarist
 Bob Pearson (1907–1985), English singer and pianist

Q-Z
 Bob Rafelson (born 1933), co-creator/producer/writer of The Monkees
 Bob Roberts (folksinger) (1907–1982), British folk singer and songwriter
 Bob Roberts (singer) (1879–1930), American novelty singer
 Bob Rock (born 1954), Canadian musician
 Bob Rockwell (born 1945), American-born Danish jazz saxophonist
 Bob Schmidt (musician) (born 1968), American multi-instrumentalist
 Bob Seger (born 1945), American rock singer, songwriter, guitarist, and pianist
 Bob Shane (1934–2020), American singer and guitarist, founding member of The Kingston Trio
 Bob Siebenberg (born 1949), American drummer
 B.o.B (Bobby Ray Simmons, born 1988), American rapper, record producer, and conspiracy theorist
 Bob Stanley (musician) (born 1964), British musician
 Bob Vincent (1918–2005), American singer
 Bob Welch (musician) (1945–2012), American musician
 Bob Weston (guitarist) (1947–2012), British guitarist
 Bob Young (musician) (born 1945), British musician
 Jawbone (musician), American blues musician Bob Zabor
 Bob Zurke (1912–1944), American jazz pianist

Artists, journalists, writers, editors, and publishers

A-M
 Bob Atwood (1907–1997), American publisher who was the longtime editor of the Anchorage Times
 Bob Bird, British newspaper editor
 Bob Brown (comics) (1915–1977), American comic book artist
 Bob Brown (newspaper publisher) (1930–1984), American newspaper publisher in Nevada
 Bob Byrne, Irish comic book artist and writer
 Bob Carroll (author) (1936–2009), American writer and historian
 Bob Considine (1906–1975), American writer and syndicated columnist
 Bob Clampett (1913–1984), American animator, producer, and director best known for his work on Looney Tunes
 Bob Gibson (artist) (1938–2010), British artist
 Bob Greene (born 1947), American journalist
 Bob Gruen (born 1945), American author and photographer
 Bob Guccione (1930–2010), American magazine publisher
 Bob Guccione, Jr. (born 1955), son of above, American magazine publisher
 Bob Gurr (born 1931), American designer
 Bob Gustafson (1920–2001), American comic book artist
 Bob Herbert (born 1945), American journalist and syndicated columnist
 Robert H. Jackson (photographer) (born 1934), known as Bob Jackson, American photographer
 Bob Justin (born 1941), American artist
 Bob Kane (1915–1998), American comic book artist
 Bob Kur (born 1948), American journalist
 Bob Marshall (wilderness activist) (1901–1939), American forester, writer and activist
 Bob McLeod (comics) (born 1951), American comic book artist

O-Z
 Bob Oksner (1916–2007), American comic book artist
 Bob Ong (born 1975), Filipino author
 Bob Perelman (born 1947), American poet
 Bob Peterson (photographer) (born 1944), Canadian photographer
 Bob Ross (1942–1995), American painter
 Bob Ross (publisher) (1934–2003), American publisher and civil rights activist
 Bob Ryan (born 1946), American sportswriter
 Bob Scheiffer (born 1937), American journalist and news anchor
 Bob Smith (comics) (born 1951), American comic book artist
 Bob Woodward (born 1943), American investigative journalist and author best known for uncovering the Watergate scandal
 Bob Zentz, American guitarist
 Bob Ziering, American illustrator

In film, stage, television, and radio

A-G
 Bob Anderson (director) (born 1965), American animation director on The Simpsons
 Bob Avian (born 1937), American theatrical producer, choreographer, and director
 Bob Baker (born 1939), British television writer
 Bob Barker (born 1923), American former television game show host
 Bob Beemer (born 1955), American sound engineer
 Bob Beckel (born 1948), American political analyst
 Bob Bender (born 1957), American basketball coach
 Bob Bergen (born 1964), American voice actor
 Bob Boyle (animator), American animator
 Bob Byington (born 1971), American director, screenwriter, and actor
 Bob Camp (born 1956), American animator, director, producer, and comic book artist
 Bob Carroll (singer/actor) (1918–1994), American actor and singer
 Bob Carroll, Jr. (1918–2007), American television writer
 Bob Carruthers (born 1960), British filmmaker
 Bob Clark (1939–2007), American actor, director, screenwriter, and producer
 Bob Collins (broadcaster) (1942–2000), American radio broadcaster
 Bob Courtney (1922–2010), South African actor and broadcaster
 Bob Crowley (born 1951), American former teacher and reality TV personality
 Bob DeLaurentis, American television producer and writer
 Bob Delegall (1945–2006), American actor, director, and producer
 Bob Denver (1935–2005), American actor and comedian
 Bob Dishy (born 1934), American stage, film, and television actor
 Bob Dyer (1909–1984), Australian entertainer
 Bob Einstein (1942–2019), American actor
 Big Brother Bob Emery (1897–1982), American children's show host
 Bob Fosse (1927–1987), American actor, dancer, choreographer, director, and screenwriter
 Bob Golding (born 1970), British actor
 Bob Guiney (born 1971), bachelor on The Bachelor
 Bob Gunton (born 1945), American actor

H-S
 Bob Hope (1903–2003), British-born American entertainer
 Bob Horn (broadcaster) (1916–1966), American television host
 Bob Hoskins (1942–2014), English actor
 Bob Johnson (actor) (1920–1993), American actor
 Bob Johnson (weather forecaster), British weatherman
 Bob Devin Jones (born 1954), American playwright
 Bob Jones (sound engineer), British sound engineer
 Bob Justman (1926–2008), American television producer
 Bob Keeshan (1927–2004), American actor and producer
 Bob Kevoian (born 1950), American radio host
 Bob McGrath (1932–2022), American actor best known for playing Bob Johnson on Sesame Street
 Bob Monkhouse (1928–2003), British game show host, comedian and comedy writer. 
 Bob Murawski (born 1964), American film editor
 Bob Newhart (born 1929), American comedian and actor
 Bob Nickman, American comedian, actor, writer, and producer
 Bob Odenkirk (born 1962), American actor and director
 Bob Peterson (filmmaker) (born 1961), American director
 Bob Phillips (born 1951), American journalist
 Bob Quinn (Irish filmmaker) (born 1935), Irish director
 Bob Ray, American filmmaker
 Bob Roberts (cinematographer) (died after 1955), American cinematographer
 Bob Ross (1942–1995), American painter and television host
 Bob Saget (1956–2022), American comedian, actor and television presenter
 Buffalo Bob Smith (1917–1998), American television host
 Bob Smith (comedian) (1958–2018), American comedian
 Bob Steele (1911–2002), American radio broadcaster

V-Z
 Bob Van der Veken (1928–2019), Belgian actor
 Bob Vila (born 1946), American home improvement television host
 Bob Vosse (1927–1999), American adult film director
 Bob West (born 1956), American actor known for voicing Barney the Dinosaur from 1988 to 2000
 Bob Weinstein (born 1954), American film producer
 Bob "Hoolihan" Wells (born 1933), American actor and television and radio personality
 Bob Yari (born 1961), Iranian-born American film producer
 Bob Young (news anchor) (1923–2011), anchor of the ABC Evening News in the 1960s
 Bob Young (TV producer), American television producer
 Bob Zany (born 1961), American comedian
 Bob Zmuda (born 1949), American writer, comedian, producer, and director

In sports

Baseball
 Bob Addie (1910–1982), American sportswriter who covered baseball
 Bob Addy (1842–1910), Canadian baseball player
 Bob Allison (1934–1995), American baseball outfielder
 Bob Anderson (baseball) (1935–2015), American baseball pitcher
 Bob Black (baseball) (1862–1933), American baseball player
 Bob Boone (born 1942), American retired Major League Baseball player and manager
 Bob Bowman (outfielder) (1930–2017), American outfielder
 Bob Brown (pitcher) (1911–1990), American professional baseball player
 Bob Brown (baseball player, born 1876) (1876–1962), American-born Canadian professional baseball player
 Bob Caruthers (1864–1911), American pitcher and right fielder
 Bob Casey (baseball announcer) (1925–2005), American baseball announcer
 Bob Casey (third baseman) (1859–1936), Canadian baseball player
 Bob Conley (baseball) (born 1934), American pitcher
 Bob Coulson (1887–1953), American outfielder
 Bob Countryman (1894–1965), American minor league player and coach
 Bob Chance (1940–2013), American baseball player, a first baseman
 Bob De Carolis (born 1952), American athletic director and softball coach
 Bob Didier (born 1949), American baseball catcher
 Bob Dillinger (1918–2009), American baseball player
 Bob DiPietro (1927–2012), American baseball player, a right fielder
 Bob Ewing (1873–1947), American pitcher
 Bob Feller (1918–2010), American Hall of Fame MLB pitcher
 Bob Ferguson (infielder) (1845–1894), American player, manager, and umpire
 Bob Ferguson (pitcher) (1919–2008), American pitcher
 Bob Gibson (1935–2020), American Hall of Fame MLB pitcher
 Bob Gibson (1980s pitcher) (born 1957), American baseball pitcher
 Bob Gorinski (born 1952), American designated hitter and outfielder
 Bob Hansen (baseball) (born 1948), American professional baseball player
 Bob Humphreys (baseball) (born 1935), American baseball pitcher
 Bob Johnson (catcher) (born 1959), American baseball catcher
 Bob Johnson (infielder) (1936–2019), American baseball infielder
 Bob Johnson (outfielder) (1905–1982), American baseball left fielder
 Bob Johnson (pitcher) (born 1943), American baseball pitcher
 Bob Jones (third baseman) (1889–1964), American baseball player
 Bob Kipper (born 1964), American baseball coach
 Bob Lee (baseball) (born 1937), American relief pitcher
 Bob Lemon (1920–2000), American Major League Baseball Hall of Fame Pitcher, and Manager
 Bob Melvin (born 1961), American Major League Baseball player and manager
 Bob Meusel (1896–1977), American Major League Baseball player
 Bob Milacki (born 1964), American baseball pitcher
 Bob Nieman (1927–1985), American outfielder
 Bob O'Brien (born 1949), American baseball pitcher
 Bob O'Farrell (1896–1988), American baseball player and manager
 Bob Ojeda (born 1957), American baseball pitcher
 Bob Patrick (1917–1999), American outfielder
 Bob Peterson (baseball) (1884–1962), American catcher
 Bob Pettit (baseball) (1861–1910), American outfielder
 Bob Quinn (baseball, born 1870) (1870–1954), American baseball executive, grandfather of below
 Bob Quinn (baseball grandson) (born 1936), American baseball executive, grandson of above
 Bob Robertson (born 1946), American first baseman
 Bob Ross (baseball) (born 1928), American baseball pitcher
 Bob Schmidt (baseball) (1933–2015), American baseball player
 Bob Shirley (born 1954), American baseball pitcher
 Bob Short (1917–1982), American baseball owner
 Bob Skinner (born 1931), American baseball player, coach, and manager
 Bob Stanley (baseball) (born 1954), American pitcher
 Bob Turley (1930–2013), American pitcher
 Bob Vines (1897–1982), American pitcher
 Bob Zick (1927–2017), American pitcher
 Bob Zupcic (born 1966), American outfielder

Basketball
 Bob Brown (basketball, born 1921) (1921–2001), American professional basketball player in the NBL
 Bob Brown (basketball, born 1923) (1923–2016), American professional basketball player in the NBA
 Bob Carney (1932–2011), American basketball player
 Bob Carrington (born 1953), American basketball player
 Bob Cousy (born 1928), American Hall-of-Fame basketball player
 Bob Davies (1920–1990), American basketball player
 Bob Delaney (basketball referee) (born 1951), American basketball referee
 Bob Dille (1917-1998), American basketball player
 Bob Duffy (basketball, born 1922) (1922-1978), American basketball player
 Bob Duffy (basketball, born 1940) (born 1940), American basketball coach
 Bob Gibbons, American high school basketball talent scout and coach
 Bob Griffin (born 1950), American-Israeli basketball player, and English Literature professor
 Bob Hansen (born 1961), American professional basketball player
 Bob Hoffman (basketball) (born 1957), American basketball coach
 Bob Kinney (1920–1985), American basketball player
 Bob Knight (born 1940), American college basketball coach
 Bob McAdoo (born 1951), American basketball player
 Bob McKillop (born 1950), American basketball coach
 Bob Myers (born 1975), American basketball executive
 Bob Peterson (basketball) (1932–2011), American basketball player
 Bob Pettit (born 1932), American basketball player
 Bob Quick (basketball) (born 1946), American basketball player
 Bob Sura (born 1973), American basketball player
 Bob Zuffelato (born 1937), American-born Canadian basketball scout

Cricket 
 Bob McLoed (1868-1907), Australian Cricket player
 Bob Simpson (born 1936), Australian Cricket Player
 Bob Willis (1949-2019), English Cricket Player

Football
Below include people associated with the various football codes, which include gridiron football, association football (soccer), rugby league, rugby union, Gaelic football, and Australian rules football.

 Bob Ackles (1938–2008), Canadian football administrator
 Bob Anderson (American football) (born 1938), American football halfback
 Bob Anderson (footballer) (1924–1994), British goalkeeper
 Bob Bellinger (1913–1955), American football player
 Bob Beattie (American football) (1902–1983), American football tackle
 Bob Beattie (footballer) (born 1943), Australian rules footballer
 Bob Beatty (born 1955), American football coach.
 Bob Bergeron (born 1961), American football player, a placekicker
 Bob Bird (footballer) (1875–1946), Australian rules footballer
 Bob Bjorklund (1918–1994), American football player
 Bob Blackman (American football) (1918–2000), American football player and coach
 Bob Books (American football) (1903–1954), American football player
 Bob Bostad (born 1966), American football coach
 Bob Bosustow (1934–1997), Australian rules footballer
 Bob Bowlsby (born 1952), American football administrator
 Bob Boyle (footballer) (1876–1927), Australian rules footballer
 Bob Brown (Canadian football) (born 1944), Canadian football player
 Bob Brown (defensive lineman) (1940-1998), American football player
 Bob Brown (footballer, born 1869) (1869–after 1901), British footballer
 Bob Brown (footballer, born 1870) (1870–after 1901), British footballer
 Bob Brown (footballer, born 1895) (1895–1980), British footballer
 Bob Brown (offensive lineman) (born 1941), American football player
 Bob Brown (rugby league) (c. 1905–after 1940), British rugby league player
 Bob Brown (rugby union) (born 1953), Australian rugby union player
 Bob Carroll (footballer) (born 1941), Australian rules footballer
 Bob Casey (rugby union) (born 1978), Irish rugby union player
 Bob Chandler (1949–1995), American football wide receiver
 Bob Collins (footballer, born 1934) (1934–2018), Australian rules footballer
 Bob Collins (footballer, born 1937) (1937–2018), Australian rules footballer
 Bob Coverdale (1928–?), English rugby league player
 Bob Crampsey (1930–2008), Scottish soccer reporter
 Bob Damewood (1940–2009), American football coach
 Bob Davie (American football) (born 1954), American football coach
 Bob DeBesse (born 1959), American football coach
 Bob Dee (1933–1979), American football defensive end
 Bob Dees (1929–1997), American football defensive tackle
 Bob Delanty (born 1940), Australian rules footballer from Tasmania
 Bob deLauer (1920–2002), American football player
 Bob Delgado (born 1949), Welsh footballer
 Bob Denton (1934-2014), American football defensive end and tackle
 Bob Diaco (born 1973), American football coach
 Bob Dixon (footballer) (1904–1980), English goalkeeper
 Bob Duff (rugby union) (1925–2006), New Zealand rugby union player and coach
 Bob Dyce, Canadian football coach
 Robert Forbes (American football) (1886–1947), known as Bob Forbes, American football coach
 Bob Gibson (American football) (1927–2015), American football coach
 Bob Gibson (footballer) (1927–1989), English soccer player
 Bob Goodridge (born 1946), American football player
 Bob Gould (rugby player) (1863–1931), Welsh rugby union player
 Bob Green (footballer) (1911–1949), Australian rules footballer
 Bob Griese (born 1945), American football quarterback
 Bob Gude (1918–1998), American football center
 Bob Guelker (1923–1986), American soccer coach
 Bob Hainlen (born 1926), American football player
 Bob Hantla (born 1931), American football player
 Bob Hayes (1942–2002), American Olympic sprinter and football wide receiver
 Bob Hempel (born 1936), Australian rules footballer
 Bob Humphreys (American football) (born 1940), American football player
 Bob Hoffman (American football) (1917–2005), American football player
 Bob Horn (American football) (born 1954), American linebacker
 Bob Jackson (American football) (born 1940), American running back
 Bob Jackson (footballer, born 1934) (born 1934), English footballer
 Bob Jackson (football manager) (died after 1952), English association football manager
 Bob Jenkins (American football) (1923–2001), American football halfback
 Bob Johnson (Australian footballer, born 1902) (1902–1981), Australian rules football player
 Bob Johnson (Australian footballer, born 1935) (1935–2001), Australian rules football player
 Bob Johnson (American football) (born 1946), American football player
 Bob Johnson (footballer, born 1905) (1905–1987), British soccer player
 Bob Johnson (footballer, born 1911) (1911–1982), British soccer defender
 Bob Jones (Australian footballer) (born 1961), Australian rules footballer for St. Kilda
 Bob Jones (rugby union) (1875–1944), Welsh rugby union forward
 Bob Joswick (born 1946), American football player
 Bob Jury (born 1955), American football defensive list
 Bob Holburn, Canadian football player
 Bob Kalsu (1945–1970), American football player
 Bob Kiddle (1869–1918), British footballer
 Bob Kilcullen (1935–2019), American football player, a defensive end
 Bob Kimoff (1932–2003), Canadian football player
 Bob Kingston (born 1944), Australian rules footballer
 Bob Latchford (born 1951), British footballer
 Bob Lee (quarterback) (born 1946), American quarterback
 Bob Lee (Australian footballer) (1927–2001), Australian rules footballer
 Bob Lee (footballer, born 1953) (born 1953), British forward
 Bob Lenarduzzi (born 1955), Canadian soccer player
 Bob Livingstone (1922–2013), American football player
 Bob Lutz (American football), American high school football coach
 Bob MacLeod (1917–2002), American football halfback
 Bob McChesney (American football, born 1912) (1912–1986), American football player
 Bob McChesney (American football, born 1926) (1926–2002), American football player
 Bob McLean (Australian footballer) (1914–1989), Australian rules footballer
 Bob McLean (rugby union) (born 1949), Australian rugby union player
 Bob McLean (Scottish footballer) (1902–1970), Scottish soccer player
 Bob McLellan (1916–2007), Australian rules footballer
 Bob McLeod (American football) (born 1938), American tight end
 Bob Moore (American football) (born 1949), American football tight end
 Bob Moore (Australian footballer) (1872–1938), Australian rules footballer
 Bob Moore (Irish footballer) (died after 1887), Irish footballer
 Bob Newland (1948–2021), American football wide receiver
 Bob Nicholson (rugby league) (died after 1950), British rugby league player
 Bob Nicholson (sports executive) (born 1955), Canadian football and baseball administrator
 Bob Nielson (born 1959), American football coach
 Bob O'Billovich (born 1940), Canadian football player
 Bob O'Connor (American football) (1904–1998), American football player
 Bob O'Dea (1930–1986), New Zealand rugby union player
 Bob Odell (American football) (1922–2012), American football player in the College Football Hall of Fame
 Bob O'Leary (1951-1993), American soccer player
 Bob Olson (born 1949), American football player
 Bob O'Neill (1905–1978), Australian rules footballer
 Bob O'Reilly (born 1949), Australian rugby league player
 Bob Parker (footballer) (born 1935), English defender
 Bob Petrich (born 1941), American football defensive end
 Bob Petrie (1874–1947), Scottish halfback
 Bob Peyton (born 1954), English halfback
 Bob Quickenden (born c. 1928), New Zealand soccer player
 Bob Quinn (American football) (born 1976), American football scout
 Bob Quinn (Australian footballer) (1915–2008), Australian rules footballer
 Bob Roberts (Australian footballer) (born 1930), Australian rules footballer
 Bob Roberts (footballer, born 1859) (1859–1929), English goalkeeper
 Bob Roberts (footballer, born 1863) (1863–1950), Welsh full back
 Robert Roberts (footballer, born 1864) (1864–1932), known as Bob Roberts, Welsh midfielder
 Bob Robson (footballer) (1957–1988), American goalkeeper
 Bob Rose (footballer) (1928–2003), Australian rules footballer and coach
 Bob Ross (Australian footballer) (1908–1988), Australian rules footballer
 Bob Ryan (rugby league) (died 2009), British rugby league forward
 Bob Sanders (born 1981), American football safety
 Bob Schmidt (American football) (born 1936), American football player
 Bob Shiring (1870–1957), American football coach
 Bob Stoops (born 1960), American football coach
 Bob Sweiger (1919–1975), American football player
 Bob Van Doren (1929–2012), American defensive end
 Bob Van Duyne (born 1952), American football guard
 Bob Voigts (1916–2000), American football coach
 Bob Vogel (born 1941), American offensive lineman
 Bob Waterfield (1920–1983), American quarterback
 Bob Waters (1938–1989), American quarterback
 Bob Westfall (1919–1980), American football player
 Bob Wilson (footballer, born 1941), Scottish goalkeeper and broadcaster
 Bob Yates (1938–2013), American football player
 Bob Young (American football) (1942–1995), American offensive guard
 Bob Young (American football coach), American football coach
 Bob Young (footballer, born 1886) (1886-after 1920), Scottish right back
 Bob Young (footballer, born 1894) (1894-1960), English footballer and manager
 Bob Zeman (1937–2019), American football defensive back
 Bob Zimny (1921–2011), American football tackle

Golf
 Bob Byman (born 1955), American golfer
 Bob Dickson (born 1944), American golfer
 Bob Kirk (1845–1886), Scottish golfer
 Bob Toski (born 1926), American golfer

Ice hockey
 Bob Bergloff (born 1958), American hockey player
 Bob Blackburn (ice hockey) (1938–2016), Canadian hockey player
 Bob Brown (ice hockey) (born 1950), Canadian hockey player
 Bob Courcy (born 1936), Canadian hockey player
 Bob Dickson (ice hockey) (born 1947), Canadian hockey player
 Bob Dill (1920–1991), American hockey player
 Bob Dillabough (1941–1997), Canadian hockey player
 Bob DiLuca (born 1946), Canadian Olympic hockey player
 Bob Gainey (born 1953), Canadian Hall-of-Fame hockey player, coach and general manager in the NHL
 Bob Johnson (ice hockey, born 1931) (1931–1991), American hockey coach
 Bob Johnson (ice hockey, born 1948) (born 1948), American hockey goalkeeper
 Bob Jones (ice hockey) (born 1945), Canadian professional hockey player
 Bob Kirkpatrick (1915–1988), Canadian hockey player
 Bob Nicholson (ice hockey) (born 1953), Canadian hockey administrator
 Bob Nystrom (born 1952), Swedish-born Canadian hockey player
 Bob MacMillan (born 1952), Canadian hockey player
 Bob Probert (1965–2010), Canadian hockey player
 Bob Robertson (ice hockey) (born 1927),  Canadian hockey player

Motorsports
 Bob Akin (1936–2002), American race car driver
 Bob Anderson (racing driver) (1931–1967), British motorcycle race driver
 Bob Brown (motorcyclist) (1930–1960), Australian motorcyclist
 Bob Burman (1884–1916), American racing driver and open-wheel racing pioneer
 Bob Cortner (1927–1959), American racing driver
 Bob Flock (1918–1964), NASCAR driver
 Bob Holden (racing driver) (born 1932), Australian racing driver
 Bob Jane (1929–2018), Australian race car driver
 Bob Kilby (1944–2009), British motorcyclist
 Bob Kubica (born 1984), Polish racing driver
 Bob McLean (racing driver) (1933–1966), Canadian racing driver

Swimming
 Bob Jackson (swimmer) (born 1957), American swimmer
 Robert J. H. Kiphuth (1890–1967), known as Bob Kiphuth, American swim coach at Yale University
 Bob Windle (born 1944), Australian swimmer

Tennis
 Bob Bryan (born 1978), American tennis player
 Bob Green (tennis) (born 1960), American tennis player
 Bob Hewitt (born 1940), Australian-South African tennis player convicted in 2015 of sex crimes
 Bob Lutz (tennis) (born 1947), American tennis player

Track and field
 Bob Anderson (runner) (born 1947), American runner and photographer
 Bob Beamon (born 1946), American long jumper
 Bob Gutowski (1935–1960), American pole vaulter
 Bob Humphreys (athlete) (born 1936), American discus thrower and shot putter
 Bob Kiesel (1911–1993), American Olympic sprinter
 Bob Richards (1926–2023), American pole vaulter and politician

Wrestling 

Bob Armstrong (born 1939), American professional wrestler
 Bob Backlund (born 1949), American professional wrestler
 Bob Brown (wrestler) (1938–1997), Canadian professional wrestler
 Bob Orton (1929–2006), American professional wrestler
 Bob Orton, Jr. (born 1950), American professional wrestler, son of the above

Announcers and sportscasters
 Bob Blackburn (announcer) (1924–2000), American basketball announcer
 Bob Carpenter (sportscaster) (born 1953), American sportscaster
 Bob Costas (born 1952), American sportscaster
 Bob DeLaney (sportscaster) (1924–2008), American sportscaster
 Bob Dillner (born 1969), American motorsports journalist and sportscaster
 Bob Jenkins (1947–2021), American sportscaster
 Bob Ley (born 1955), American sports anchor
 Bob Papa (born 1964), American sportscaster
 Bob Rodgers (born 1928), American sportscaster
 Bob Tallman (born 1947), American rodeo announcer

Other
 Bob Anderson (darts player) (born 1947), British world darts champion
 Bob Anderson (fencer) (1922–2012), British fencer
 Bob Anderson (wrestler) (born 1944), American wrestler
 Bob Baffert (born 1935), American Hall-of-Fame horse owner and trainer
 Bob Beattie (skiing) (1933–2018), American skiing coach
 Bob Blum (born 1928), American Olympic fencer
 Bob Burnquist (born 1976), Brazilian-American skateboarder
 Bob Chow (1907–2003), American shooter
 Bob Cottam (born 1944), English cricketer
 Bob Cottingham (born 1966), American fencer
 Bob Diry (c. 1890–after 1913), German boxer
Bob Fitzsimmons (1863–1917), British boxer
 Bob Foster (1938–2015), American boxer
 Bob Hoffman (sports promoter) (1898–1985), American sports promoter
 Bob Jungels (born 1992), Luxembourgish cyclist
 Bob McLeod (cricketer) (1868–1907), Australian cricketer
 Bob McLeod (cyclist) (1913–1958), Canadian cyclist
 Bob O'Keeffe (1881–1949), Irish hurler
 Bob Parker (rower) (1934–2009), New Zealand rower
 Bob Pereyra, American street luger
 Bob Schrijber (born 1965), Dutch mixed martial artist
 Bob Shillinglaw (born 1953), American lacrosse coach
 Bob Shirlaw (born 1943), Australian rower
 Bob Willis (1949–2019) English cricketer

In science, medicine and technology
 Bob Bemer (1920–2004), American computer scientist
 Bob Berner (1935–2015), American geologist
 Bob Berry (1916–2018), American dendrologist
 Bob Carr (born 1947), Australian archaeologist
 Bob Green (1925–2013), Australian naturalist and photographer
 Bob Greene (born 1958), American doctor and fitness writer
 Bob Irwin (born 1939), Australian naturalist, conservationist, and herpetologist
 Bob Johnson, British psychiatrist
 Bob O'Rear (born 1940), former employee of Microsoft
 Bob Paine (1933–2016), American zoologist
 Bob Park (born 1931), American scientist
 Bob Ryan (meteorologist), American meteorologist
Bob Scott (ornithologist) (1938–2009), British ornithologist
 Bob Smith (doctor) (1879–1950), American doctor
 Bob Van Dillen (born 1972), American meteorologist
 Bob van Luijt (born 1985), Dutch technology entrepreneur
 Bob Waterston (born 1943), American biologist

Soldiers
 Bob Doe (1920–2010), British Second World War pilot
 Bob Hoover (1922–2016), aerobatic pilot and United States Air Force test pilot and fighter pilot
 Bob Johnson (pilot) (1917–2014), Canadian Second World War pilot
 Bob Judson, British Royal Air Force commodore
 Bob Vickman (1921–1948), United States Army Air Forces and Israeli Air Force pilot
 Bob Yule (1920–1953), New Zealand Second World War Royal Air Force fighter pilot

Other professions
 Bob Black (born 1951), American anarchist and author
 Bob Dalton (outlaw) (1869–1892), American Old West outlaw, leader of the Dalton Gang
 Bob Greene (Makah) (1918–2010), Native American elder from the Makah tribe
 Bob Jackson (priest) (born 1949), British priest
 Bob Johnson (butcher) (1940–2001), British butcher
 Bob Jones, Sr. (1883–1968), American evangelist and first president of Bob Jones University
 Bob Jones, Jr. (1911–1997), son of Bob Jones, Sr. and second president of the university
 Bob Jones III (born 1939), son of Bob Jones, Jr. and third president of the university
 Bob Kramer (born 1957/58), American bladesmith
 Bob McLean (winemaker) (1947–2015), Australian wine maker
 Bob Moses (1935–2021), American civil rights activist
 Bob Quick (police officer) (born 1952), British police officer
 Robert Satiacum (1929–1991), Native American activist
 Bob Shoudt (born 1968), American competitive eater
 Haralabos Voulgaris (born 1975), known as Bob Voulgaris, Canadian gambler
 Bob Younger (1853–1889), American Old West outlaw, member of the James-Younger Gang

Fictional characters
 Bob the Builder, the title character in the animated series of the same name
 B.O.B., the name shared by the gelatinous, brainless side protagonist from Monsters vs. Aliens and Ashe's robotic companion from Overwatch
 Bob Belcher, the title character of the 2011 animated sitcom Bob's Burgers
 Bob Cutlass, a character in the 2006 Disney/Pixar animated film Cars
 Bob Fish, a dentist and the main character in Bob and Margaret
 Bob Johnson, a human character on Sesame Street
 Bob Johnson, in the 2005 American animated series Squirrel Boy
 Bob Kelso, on the American television series Scrubs
 Bob Parr, also known as Mr. Incredible in The Incredibles franchise
 Bob Pataki, in the 1996 American animated series Hey Arnold
 Bob Wilson (Fatal Fury), in the 1995 video game Fatal Fury 3
 Bob (Blackadder character), a pseudonym used by two characters
 Bob (Tekken), a video game character
 Bob (The Dresden Files), a novel and television series character
 Bob, one of the eponymous main characters of the sprite comic Bob and George
 Bob, in Adventures of God
 Bob, in Bubble Bobble
 Bob, in the Canadian animated television series ReBoot
 Bob, a character in The Suite Life of Zack & Cody
 Bob, in Weebl and Bob
 Bob, in It's a Big Big World
 Bob, the title character of the film What About Bob?
 Bob, Agent of HYDRA, a Marvel Comics villain
 Almighty Bob, a deity in the novel Mostly Harmless by Douglas Adams
 Handsome Bob, in the film RocknRolla
 Killer BOB, a villain from the American television series Twin Peaks
 Planet Bob, also known as New Earth, in the film Titan A.E.
 Sideshow Bob, a recurring character on The Simpsons
 Silent Bob, in several Kevin Smith films
 Smilin' Bob, in commercials for Enzyte
 Bob the Killer Goldfish, in the Earthworm Jim universe
 Bob the Tomato, a main character from VeggieTales
 Bob, in the animated series Oggy and the Cockroaches
 Bob "Lil' Big Bob" Bobowski, a Garo from the SMG4 series of online videos
 SpongeBob SquarePants, main character of the show of the same name
 Bob, from the spinoff of Despicable Me known as Minions, as well as its sequel

See also
 Bob's your uncle
 Common, closely related names:
 Bobby (given name), including Robbie
 Rob (disambiguation)
 Robert
 Roberta (given name)
 Bobb

References

External links
 The Bob Club

Masculine given names
Pejorative terms for men
Hypocorisms
English masculine given names